Jacob Seebacher (1833 in Germany – August 18, 1889 in New York City) was an American politician from New York.

Life
He attended the common schools in New York City. Then he became a cigar maker, and later an auctioneer. He was a lieutenant in the 6th Regiment of the National Guard. He was at times an Inspector of Lamps and Gas; a clerk in the County Clerk's office; and Warrant Clerk in the Finance Department.

He was a member of the New York State Assembly (New York Co., 8th D.) in 1865 and 1866. Afterwards, he was a deputy sheriff.

He was again a member of the State Assembly (New York Co., 6th D.) in 1878 and 1879; and a member of the New York State Senate (6th D.) in 1880 and 1881.

He died at his home at 393 Pleasant Avenue in East Harlem.

Sources
 Civil List and Constitutional History of the Colony and State of New York compiled by Edgar Albert Werner (1884; pg. 291, 367f and 377f)
 The State Government for 1879 by Charles G. Shanks (Weed, Parsons & Co, Albany NY, 1879; pg. 136f)
 Ten-Thousand-Dollar Offices — Appointments by the Sheriff Elect in NYT on December 25, 1870
 DEATH OF JACOB SEEBACHER in NYT on August 21, 1889

1833 births
1889 deaths
Democratic Party New York (state) state senators
Politicians from New York City
German emigrants to the United States
Democratic Party members of the New York State Assembly
19th-century American politicians
People from East Harlem